= 2018 El Paso County, Colorado, elections =

The 2018 El Paso County elections were held on November 6, 2018. The election included assessor, clerk and recorder, commissioner of District 1, commissioner of District 5, coroner, sheriff, surveyor, and treasurer.

All candidates are from the Colorado Secretary of State site.

All primary results and general election candidates from the El Paso County election page.

== Assessor ==
Republican incumbent assessor Steve Schleiker ran for re-election.

=== General election candidates ===
- Sue McKnight (D)
- Steve Schleiker (R), incumbent assessor

=== Republican primary ===
==== Declared ====
- Steve Schliker, incumbent assessor

==== Results ====
Republican primary results
Party	Candidate	Votes	%
Republican	Steve Schlike (incumbent)	71,453	100
Total votes		71,453	100

=== Democratic primary ===
==== Declared ====
- Sue McKnight

==== Results ====
Democratic primary results
Party	Candidate	Votes	%
Democratic	Sue McKnight	39,017	100
Total votes		39,017	100

=== Results ===
El Paso County Assessor 2018
Party	Candidate	Votes	%
Republican	Steve Schliker (incumbent)	167,460	62.6
Democratic	Sue McKnight	99,926	37.4
Total votes		267,386	100

== Clerk and recorder ==
Republican incumbent clerk and recorder Chuck Broerman ran for re-election.

=== General election candidates ===
- Elizabeth Wilkes (D)
- Chuck Broerman (R), Incumbent Clerk and Recorder

=== Republican primary ===
==== Declared ====
- Chuck Broerman, incumbent clerk and recorder

==== Results ====
Republican primary results
Party	Candidate	Votes	%
Republican	Chuck Broerman (incumbent)	72,821	100
Total votes		72,821	100

=== Democratic primary ===
==== Declared ====
- Johnathan Herrera
- Elizabeth Wilkes

==== Results ====
Democratic primary results
Party	Candidate	Votes	%
Democratic	Elizabeth Wilkes	25,868	61.6
Democratic	Jonathan Herrera	16,136	38.4
Total votes		42,004	100

=== Results ===
El Paso County Clerk and Recorder 2018
Party	Candidate	Votes	%
Republican	Chuck Broerman (incumbent)	172,117	63.8
Democratic	Elizabeth Wilkes	97,662	36.2
Total votes		269,779	100

== County Commissioner District 1 ==
Republican incumbent Darryl Glenn was term-limited and could not run for another term. He ran for U.S. House representative of Colorado District 5.

=== General election candidates ===
- Frank DeLalla (D)
- Holly Williams (R)

=== Republican primary ===
==== Republican ballot ====
- Calandra Vargas
- Holly Williams

==== Results ====
Republican primary results
Party	Candidate	Votes	%
Republican	Holly Williams	13,316	59.5
Republican	Calandra Vargas	9,060	40.5
Total votes		22,376	100

=== Democratic primary ===
==== Democratic ballot ====
- Frank Delalla

==== Results ====
Democratic primary results
Party	Candidate	Votes	%
Democratic	Frank DeLalla	6,621	100
Total votes		6,621	100

=== Results ===
El Paso County Commissioner District 1 2018
Party	Candidate	Votes	%
Republican	Holly Williams	45,944	70.2
Democratic	Frank DeLalla	19,478	29.8
Total votes		65,422	100

== County Commissioner District 5 ==
Republican incumbent Peggy Littleton was term-limited and could not run for another term. Republican Cami Bremer was elected.

=== General election candidates ===
- Cami Bremer (R)
- Kari Frederick (D)

=== Republican primary ===
==== Republican ballot ====
- Cami Bremer
- Vickie Tonkins

==== Results ====
Republican primary results
Party	Candidate	Votes	%
Republican	Cami Bremer	8,196	57.8
Republican	Vickie Tonkins	5,975	42.2
Total votes		14,171	100

=== Democratic primary ===
==== Democratic ballot ====
- Kari Frederick

==== Results ====
Democratic primary results
Party	Candidate	Votes	%
Democratic	Kari Frederick	8,548	100
Total votes		8,548	100

=== Results ===
El Paso County Commissioner District 5 2018
Party	Candidate	Votes	%
Republican	Cami Bremer	28,558	58.0
Democratic	Kari Frederick	20,665	42.0
Total votes		49,223	100

== Coroner ==
Republican incumbent Robert Bux, M.D. retired. Republican Dr. Leon Kelly was elected.

=== General election candidates ===
- Chauncey Frederick (D)
- Leon Kelly (R)

=== Republican primary ===
==== Declared ====
- Leon Kelly, M.D., forensic pathologist and current deputy chief medical examiner

==== Results ====
Republican primary results
Party	Candidate	Votes	%
Republican	Leon Kelly	72,427	100
Total votes		72,427	100

=== Democratic primary ===
==== Declared ====
- Chauncey Fredrick

==== Results ====
Democratic primary results
Party	Candidate	Votes	%
Democratic	Chauncey Frederick	38,866	100
Total votes		38,866	100

==== Withdrawn ====
- Matthew Reid

=== Results ===
El Paso County Coroner 2018
Party	Candidate	Votes	%
Republican	Leon Kelly	174,532	65.6
Democratic	Chauncey Frederick	91,329	34.4
Total votes		265,861	100

== Sheriff ==
Republican incumbent Bill Elder ran for re-election, and was re-elected.

=== General election candidates ===
- Bill Elder (R), incumbent sheriff
- Grace A. Sweeney-Maurer (D)

=== Republican primary ===
==== Republican ballot ====
- Michael Angley
- Bill Elder, incumbent sheriff

==== Results ====
Republican primary results
Party	Candidate	Votes	%
Republican	Bill Elder (incumbent)	50,027	57.7
Republican	Mike Angley	36,658	42.3
Total votes		86,685	100

=== Democratic primary ===
==== Democratic ballot ====
- Grace A. Sweeney-Maurer

==== Results ====
Democratic primary results
Party	Candidate	Votes	%
Democratic	Grace A. Sweeney-Maurer	39,044	100
Total votes		39,044	100

=== Results ===
El Paso County sheriff 2018
Party	Candidate	Votes	%
Republican	Bill Elder (Incumbent)	175,018	64.6
Democratic	Grace A. Sweeney-Maurer	95,862	35.4
Total votes		270,880	100

== Surveyor ==
Republican incumbent Lawrence Burnett was term-limited and could not run for another term. Republican Richard Mariotti was elected.

=== General election candidates ===
- Destarte Ashleigh Haun (D)
- Richard Mariotti (R)

=== Republican primary ===
==== Declared ====
- Richard Mariotti

==== Results ====
Republican primary results
Party	Candidate	Votes	%
Republican	Richard Mariotti	71,760	100
Total votes		71,760	100

=== Democratic primary ===
==== Declared ====
- Destarte Ashleigh Haun

==== Results ====
Democratic primary results
Party	Candidate	Votes	%
Democratic	Destarte Ashleigh Haun	38,831	100
Total votes		38,831	100

=== Results ===
El Paso County Surveyor 2018
Party	Candidate	Votes	%
Republican	Richard Mariotti	163,951	62.0
Democratic	Destarte Ashleigh Haun	100,439	38.0
Total votes		264,390	100

== Treasurer ==
Republican incumbent Mark Lowderman ran for re-election, and was re-elected.

=== General election candidates ===
- Mark Lowderman (R)
- Julie Torres (D)

=== Republican primary ===
==== Declared ====
- Mark Lowderman (incumbent)

==== Results ====
Republican primary results
Party	Candidate	Votes	%
Republican	Mark Lowderman (incumbent)	72,540	100
Total votes		72,540	100

=== Democratic primary ===
==== Declared ====
- Julie Torres

==== Results ====
Democratic primary results
Party	Candidate	Votes	%
Democratic	Julie Torres	39,312	100
Total votes		39,312	100

=== Results ===
El Paso County Treasurer 2018
Party	Candidate	Votes	%
Republican	Mark Lowderman (incumbent)	168,239	62.6
Democratic	Julie Torres	100,396	37.4
Total votes		268,635	100
